Hooiberg is a  high volcanic formation on the island of Aruba. It is located almost in the center of the island and can be seen from virtually anywhere on the island. 

The Dutch word hooiberg, literally translates into haystack in English, as the landform is said to resemble a stack of hay.

Many have remarked about the panoramic views obtained atop Hooiberg. 662 concrete steps lead to the top of the mountain. On a clear day Venezuela can be seen from the top. The windswept mountaintop is also the site of several radio antennas and cell sites used by Setar, an Aruban telecommunication company.

Gallery

References

Mountains and hills of Aruba